Julian Battle (born July 11, 1981) is a former professional Canadian football defensive back. He played college football for the Tennessee Volunteers.

Battle has also been a member of the Washington Redskins and Calgary Stampeders.

High school career
Battle played his high school football at Wellington Community High School.
He attended Athletes Advantage before his college career.

College career
He originally signed with the University of Miami out of high school and didn't qualify and attended junior college. He was a two-year letterman at Los Angeles Valley College before transferring to the University of Tennessee where he started all 26 games, producing 132 tackles, 7 tackles for loss, 2 sacks, 13 passes defensed, three fumble recoveries, three forced fumbles, 1 touchdown, and blocked two punts.

NFL
He was drafted in the third round of the 2003 NFL Draft by the Kansas City Chiefs. He was with the Chiefs as a safety for three seasons. He also spent time with the Washington Redskins.

CFL
He signed with the Calgary Stampeders on September 12, 2007. He helped Calgary win the 96th Grey Cup in the 2008 CFL season.

After football

References

External links

1981 births
Living people
People from Palm Beach County, Florida
American football cornerbacks
Tennessee Volunteers football players
Kansas City Chiefs players
American players of Canadian football
Canadian football defensive backs
Calgary Stampeders players